Ulaanbaataryn Unaganuud Football Club is a Mongolian football club from Ulaanbaatar. They compete in the Mongolian Premier League and are also known as UBU FC (УБУ ФС). In addition to competing in the Khurkhree League, the university team have also competed in the Asian Student Championships in 2007 and 2009 as well as a friendly tournament between teams from Mongolia, China and Korea in 2005. The club also run a futsal team which is based in the university sports hall.

Honours
 Mongolian Premier League: (1)
 Winner : 2009

References

Football clubs in Mongolia
2001 establishments in Mongolia
Association football clubs established in 2001